Leo Albert Drey Jr. (January 19, 1917 – May 26, 2015), was an American timber magnate, conservationist, and philanthropist from Missouri.

Biography
Born in St. Louis, Missouri, to a wealthy manufacturer of glassware, Drey was a 1935 graduate of John Burroughs School and a 1939 graduate of Antioch College. In 1937, he was 20 and traveling with six other students in Shanghai when war broke out between China and Japan. Drey began acquiring timberland in the Missouri Ozarks for reforestation and conservation in 1951. The project, known as Pioneer Forest, is a commercial forest managed in the public interest, with single-tree selection harvesting techniques, which he pioneered. Drey purchased the Greer Mill property in 1987, and later sold it to the Forest Service for incorporation into the Eleven Point District of the Mark Twain National Forest.

Drey founded the L-A-D Foundation, which acquires and protects other natural areas in the state, leasing many of them to the state park system at $1 per year. Other Drey beneficiaries have included his alma mater Antioch College; John Burroughs School, which uses Drey land for biology and outdoor education courses; the Government Accountability Project; and Missouri Coalition for the Environment, Missouri's first independent citizens' group to address a broad range of environmental issues. In 1991, he donated his papers to the Western Historical Manuscript Collection at the University of Missouri–St. Louis.

His downtown office answering machine message said, "I’m out planting a forest. Please leave your name and number and I’ll try to get back to you before it matures."  In 1955, Drey married Kay Kranzberg, who became, like himself, an environmental and civic advocate for more than half a century. Together, they raised three children, two daughters, Laura and Eleanor, and a son, Leonard.

Drey died at his home in University City, Missouri at age 98 on May 26, 2015, two weeks after suffering a stroke. His body was donated to the Washington University School of Medicine for science.

References

External links
 "Building Natural Wealth" in the Missouri Conservationist
 The L-A-D Foundation

Antioch College alumni
American conservationists
1917 births
2015 deaths
Businesspeople in timber
Businesspeople from St. Louis
Activists from St. Louis
20th-century American businesspeople
20th-century American philanthropists